Denis Igorevich Gershun (born 1 April 1976) is a Russian professional football coach and a former player. He is the manager of FC Avangard Kursk.

Club career
He made his Russian Football National League debut for FC Tyumen on 4 April 1999 in a game against FC Lokomotiv Saint Petersburg.

External links 
 

1976 births
Sportspeople from Kursk
Living people
Russian footballers
FC Dynamo Moscow reserves players
FC Tyumen players
FC Salyut Belgorod players
FC Avangard Kursk players
Association football midfielders
Association football forwards
Russian football managers